Minister of Mines may refer to

 Minister of Mines (Canada)
 Minister of Mines (India)